Lora Ottenad (born February 3, 1964) is a professional female bodybuilder from Las Vegas, Nevada.

Standing 174 cm and 188 cm with heels and boasting an offseason weight of approximately 107 kg., Ottenad is one of the largest female bodybuilders competing today. She established herself as a top amateur competitor in 2000 when she won the heavyweight title at the USA Championships, but a pro card eluded her when she lost the overall title to Jennifer McVicar in a controversial decision, and only the overall winner of the USAs earns a pro card. At that year's Nationals, Ottenad lost the heavyweight class to Heather Foster. Winning the class would have earned her a pro card) in a close decision that received boos from the audience. Ottenad placed second at the Nationals again in 2004. After a 5th place finish in 2005, she finally earned her pro card in 2006 by winning the overall title at the Nationals. In her pro debut, Ottenad finished 11th at the 2007 Ms. International.

Contest history 
1991 Seattle - 1st (HW and Overall)
1992 Washington State Championship - 1st (HW)
1995 Western Washington - 1st (HW and Overall)
1996 Emerald Cup - 1st (HW)
1996 NPC USA Championship - 11th (HW)
1997 Emerald Cup - 1st (HW)
1999 Ironmaiden - 1st (HW and Overall)
2000 NPC USA Championship - 1st (HW)
2000 NPC Nationals - 2nd (HW)
2001 NPC USA Championship - 9th (HW)
2003 NPC USA Championship - 4th (HW)
2003 NPC Nationals - 3rd (HW)
2004 NPC Nationals - 2nd (HW)
2005 NPC Nationals - 5th (HW)
2006 IFBB North American Amateur - 2nd (HW)
2006 NPC Nationals - 1st (HW & Overall)
2007 IFBB Ms. International - 11th
2007 IFBB Atlantic City Pro - 4th (HW)
2009 IFBB Atlantic City Pro - 12th
2011 IFBB Europa Battle of Champions - 6th
2011 IFBB Pro Bodybuilding Weekly Championships - 12th
2013 IFBB Pro Bodybuilding Weekly Championships - 8th
2015 IFBB Wings of Strength Chicago Pro-Am Extravaganza - 9th overall and 5th masters
2016 IFBB Lenda Murray Pro AM - 2nd
2016 IFBB Wings of Strength Rising Phoenix World Championships – 15th

References

1964 births
Living people
Sportspeople from Seattle
American female bodybuilders
Professional bodybuilders
21st-century American women